Lowry Solutions provides RFID services, barcode and wireless networking services, bar coding equipment, automatic label applicators, software, custom labels, ribbons and supplies.

Headquartered in Brighton, Michigan, it is partnered with companies such as Zebra, Honeywell, Motion Computing, Panasonic and  Paragon Labeling.

History 
In 1974, Richard Lowry founded a business called Lowry & Associates. The company served as a Manufacturers' Rep Firm selling for Intel. Some of the items in its portfolio included single board computers, memory cards, power supplies, analog to digital I/O and Intel microprocessor development systems. Most of the computers in those days were used for test and measurement applications in R&D and manufacturing environments. Lowry & Associates had the exclusive regional rights to Intel systems products at that time.

Spartan Stores in Grand Rapids, MI, was Lowry's first bar code sale. The company saw what Lowry's team was doing in the digital printing graphics environment and was asked by Spartan if they could provide them with a bar code printing solution. At the time, Lowry & Associates was reselling Printronix printers.

By 1986, Lowry sales grew to $19 million covering a four-state region. $11 million was in sales of computer peripherals and $8 million was in AIDC products and services. At that time, Lowry decided to spend more time and money on growing the AIDC side of the business. And, by 1990, Lowry Computer Products was making $19 million per year in just AIDC sales.

Between the years 1994 and 1996, Lowry grew from a regional company to national sales coverage by acquiring 4 regional VAR companies; two of those VAR Company's also had label conversion manufacturing capability.  In 1996, Lowry consolidated all manufacturing operations into their 40,000 square foot plant in White Bear Lake, Minnesota.

In 1996 Lowry began manufacturing a line of label applicators and automated print and apply systems which they still sell today under the Paragon Brand name. They offer their customers a choice of Zebra, Sato and Datamax print engines. Paragon units are installed on a global basis for some of the largest Fortune 500 companies such as P&G, 3M, and many others.

In January 2014, Lowry Computers became Lowry Solutions.

In May 2015, Lowry Solutions was awarded the AIT-V Contract. It was one of three companies that will provide automatic identification technology data communications, software, hardware, documentation and associated services under a $181 million indefinite-delivery/indefinite-quantity contract.

References 

Electronics companies of the United States
Companies based in Michigan
Radio-frequency identification
Radio-frequency identification companies
Electronics companies established in 1974
1974 establishments in Michigan